Ehire Enrique Adrianza Palma (born August 21, 1989) is a Venezuelan-American professional baseball shortstop in the Atlanta Braves organization. He has previously played in Major League Baseball (MLB) for the San Francisco Giants, Minnesota Twins, Washington Nationals and Atlanta Braves.

Career

San Francisco Giants

Adrianza began his professional career in 2006, playing for the DSL Giants and hitting .156 in 122 at-bats. In 2007, he played again for the DSL Giants, improving his batting average to .241 in 249 at-bats, stealing 23 bases in 29 attempts.

Adrianza played in the United States for the first time in 2008, splitting the season between three teams – the AZL Giants (15 games), Salem-Keizer Volcanoes (one game) and the Fresno Grizzlies (two games). Overall, he hit a combined .288 in 66 at-bats.

After hitting .258 in 388 at-bats for the Augusta Greenjackets in 2009, Adrianza helped the San Jose Giants win the California League Championship in 2010. He hit .256 in 445 at-bats, stealing 33 bases in 48 attempts.  He would remain in San Jose during the bulk of the 2011 season.  In 2011, Adrianza batted .300 with 3 home runs and 27 RBIs.

Adrianza made his MLB debut on September 8, 2013, against the Arizona Diamondbacks, and in doing so became the 300th Venezuelan to play in Major League Baseball. He entered the game as a pinch runner in the 11th inning and scored the winning run in a 3–2 victory.

Adrianza hit his first career home run on September 22, 2013 against the New York Yankees. He broke up a no-hit bid by Andy Pettitte in his final start at Yankee Stadium. He appeared in 105 games over the 2014–2015 campaigns with San Francisco, driving in 16 runs and taking the field primarily as a middle infielder. On April 9, 2016, Adrianza homered off Clayton Kershaw for his 2nd career home run. Adrianza and the Giants avoided salary arbitration on December 3, agreeing to a one-year, $600,000 contract. The Giants designated him for assignment on January 24, 2017.

On January 31, 2017, Adrianza was claimed off waivers by the Milwaukee Brewers. Adrianza was subsequently designated for assignment on February 2, 2017.

Minnesota Twins

On February 6, Adrianza was claimed by the Minnesota Twins. He played in 70 games for the Twins in 2017, compiling a batting average of .265 with 2 homers and 24 RBI. Before the 2018 season began, Adrianza agreed to a one-year contract worth $1 million. He established himself as a regular in the Twins’ infield over the course of the season. In 114 games, he hit .251 with 6 home runs and 39 RBIs. Adrianza set career bests by hitting 23 doubles and playing in 114 games. He returned to the Twins for the 2019 season, signing a contract worth $1.3 million. On September 29, 2019, Adrianza managed the Twins in place of Rocco Baldelli during a late-season contest after the Twins had won the American League Central division. The team lost 5-4 on a walk-off sac-fly to the Kansas City Royals. For the season, he hit .272/.349/.416 in 83 games. In December 2019, Adrianza agreed to a third consecutive one-year contract, which paid him $1.6 million for the 2020 season. In 2020, Adrianza hit .191/.287/.270 with 17 hits and no home runs in 89 at-bats over 44 games.

Atlanta Braves
On January 26, 2021, Adrianza signed a minor league contract with the Atlanta Braves organization. He also received an invitation to attend Major League spring training. On March 27, Adrianza was selected to the 40-man roster. In 2021, he batted .247/.327/.401 with 5 home runs and 28 RBIs. The Braves finished with an 88-73 record, clinching the NL East, and eventually won the 2021 World Series, giving the Braves their first title since 1995.

Washington Nationals
On March 14, 2022, Adrianza signed a one-year contract with the Washington Nationals. Adrianza was placed on the 60-day injured list to start the year on April 21, 2022, after suffering a quadriceps strain. He was activated on June 7.

Atlanta Braves (second stint)
On August 1, 2022, Adrianza was traded to the Braves for minor league outfielder Trey Harris. He re-signed a minor league deal on December 16, 2022.

Personal life
Adrianza was born to Ehire Sr. and Nitza in 1989. He is married to Vielimar. As of 2014, near the start of his major league career, Adrianza's mother lived in Venezuela. By 2020, his parents, wife, and child had settled in Miami.  

On April 5, 2021, Adrianza became a naturalized citizen of the United States. On November 2, 2021, Adrianza was removed from the Braves' World Series roster ahead of Game 6 when his wife went into labor.

References

External links

1989 births
Living people
Arizona League Giants players
Atlanta Braves players
Augusta GreenJackets players
Dominican Summer League Giants players
Venezuelan expatriate baseball players in the Dominican Republic
Fort Myers Miracle players
Fresno Grizzlies players
Major League Baseball shortstops
Major League Baseball players from Venezuela
Minnesota Twins players
People from Miranda (state)
Richmond Flying Squirrels players
Rochester Red Wings players
Sacramento River Cats players
Salem-Keizer Volcanoes players
San Francisco Giants players
San Jose Giants players
Tiburones de La Guaira players
Venezuelan expatriate baseball players in the United States
Washington Nationals players